Farhan Ahmad (born 7 June 1994) is a Pakistani athlete. Ahmad was Pakistan's only representative at the 2011 World Championships held in South Korea, where he competed in the 800 metres. He achieved a personal best of 1:50.14 minutes at the competition.

References

External links

Living people
1994 births
Pakistani male middle-distance runners
World Athletics Championships athletes for Pakistan